The Worldwide Ultralite Clipper is an American ultralight aircraft that was designed and produced by Worldwide Ultralite Industries of Katy, Texas in the early 1980s. The aircraft was supplied as a kit for amateur construction.

With a strut-braced parasol-wing, conventional landing gear, single engine in tractor configuration and its single-seat, open cockpit configuration, the Clipper resembles a small conventional light aircraft and was designed to appeal to private pilots looking for an ultralight aircraft.

Design and development

The aircraft is made from bolted-together aluminum tubing, covered in Dacron sailcloth. Its  span wing has flaps and is supported by parallel lift struts and jury struts. The airframe was proof tested to +9/-6g ultimate load. The conventional landing gear features balloon tires and a steerable tailwheel. The standard powerplant supplied by the factory was the  Rotax 447, single ignition, two cylinder, two-stroke aircraft engine.

The company was noted for its marketing of the aircraft at trade shows, such as EAA AirVenture. They employed scantily-clad models to attract attention to the aircraft, something not normally seen at aircraft trade shows.

Specifications (Clipper)

References

1980s United States ultralight aircraft
Homebuilt aircraft
Single-engined tractor aircraft
Worldwide Ultralite aircraft